The Três Marias Dam, also known as Bernardo Mascarenhas, is an embankment dam on the São Francisco River near Três Marias in Minas Gerais, Brazil. It was constructed for hydroelectric power production and flood control. The dam was completed in 1961 and its first generator was operational in 1962. The dam's power plant is named after Bernard Mascarenhas who in 1889, built South America's first major hydroelectric power plant in Brazil, the Marmelos Zero Power Plant.

Background
Construction on the dam began in May 1957 with a goal to stabilize the river's flow, improve navigation and to produce hydroelectric power. 10,000 people worked on the project and Brazilian President Juscelino Kubitschek was influential in the dam's construction pace. The majority of the dam works were completed in January 1961 and its first generator was operational in 1962. The other five generators went online by 1969. The dam does not have a fish ladder and effectively halted fish migration in the upper São Francisco River while also splitting it into two zones.

Specifications

Bernard Mascarenhas Power Plant
There is additional room for two more generators in the power station which would increase the capacity to  if installed. The Kaplan turbines used in the power station were designed by Voith and first installed in 1958.

See also

List of power stations in Brazil

References

Dams completed in 1961
Dams in Minas Gerais
Embankment dams
Dams on the São Francisco River